The Maxwell Football Club (originally called the Maxwell Football Club of Philadelphia) was established in 1935 to promote safety in the game of American football. Named in honor of Robert W. "Tiny" Maxwell, legendary college player, official, and sports columnist, the club was founded by his friend Bert Bell, then owner of the Philadelphia Eagles professional football team and later commissioner of the National Football League (NFL) along with Edwin Pollock. The awards are presented during the spring of the following year.

As of 2017, the club's president is Mark Dianno, and the club's Chairman is former NFL defensive back Shawn Wooden. The club's headquarters are located in Ambler, Pennsylvania.

Awards
The club presents several awards annually to professional, college, and high-school football players, coaches, and others, including:
Maxwell Award for College Player of the Year, first awarded in 1937
Chuck Bednarik Award for College Defensive Player of the Year, instituted in 1995
George Munger Award for College Coach of the Year, introduced in 1989
Bert Bell Award for Professional Player of the Year, established following Bell's death in 1959
Jim Henry Award for Area High-School Student-Athlete Football Player of the Year, instituted in 1986
New Jersey High School Player of the Year
Pennsylvania High School Player of the Year
Delaware High School Player of the Year
Earle "Greasy" Neale Award for Professional Coach of the Year, introduced in 1989
Reds Bagnell Award for Contributions to the Game of Football, introduced in 1989
Brian Westbrook Tri-State Player of the Year Award, first presented in 2001
Tri-State Coach of the Year Award, established in 1998
Tropicana Legends Award, established in 2003
The Thomas Brookshier Spirit Award
National High School Player Award, presented by adidas to the best high school football player in the United States, first awarded in 2007
Steinberg-DeNicloa Humanitarian Award – Presented for philanthropic effort in the community

Former awards
Al Lucas Award for Arena Football League Player of the Year (introduced in 2004, discontinued in 2007)
Joseph V. Paterno Award (introduced in 2010 as a replacement for the George Munger Award, discontinued in 2011)

See also
National College Football Awards Association
Kansas City Committee of 101 Awards
Washington D.C. Touchdown Club
Touchdown Club of Columbus

References

External links

American football trophies and awards
College football awards organizations
Sports organizations established in 1935
Sports in Philadelphia